Moses Calhoun Vasbinder (July 19, 1880 – December 22, 1950) was a Major League Baseball pitcher who played for one season. He played for the Cleveland Bronchos for two games during the 1902 season.

External links

1880 births
1950 deaths
Major League Baseball pitchers
Cleveland Bronchos players
Marion Glass Blowers players
Columbus Senators players
Minneapolis Millers (baseball) players
Butte Miners players
Butte Fruit Pickers players
Denver Grizzlies (baseball) players
Braddock Infants players
Baseball players from Ohio
People from Harrison County, Ohio